Hugh McRoberts Secondary School, officially "École Secondaire Hugh McRoberts Secondary School", is a Canadian school in Richmond, British Columbia.

Named after Hugh McRoberts, an early settler on Sea Island, this secondary school (grades 8-12 in British Columbia) is one of the two schools in Richmond that offer the French Immersion Secondary School program (the other being McMath).  McRoberts is situated at Garden City Rd. and Williams Rd. and is a member of School District 38 Richmond.

Hugh McRoberts Secondary School opened on November 30, 1962 and was converted into a full-fledged secondary school in the mid-1990s, with the first class of the new grade 8-12 program graduating in 1997. The high school was partially renovated in 1999.

The school logo and mascot is a "Striker", which is depicted as a mounted knight carrying a lance or a claymore. The logo had previously been a shamrock.

In 2006, the Fraser Institute evaluated Hugh McRoberts Secondary as the highest ranking school compared to other secondary schools in Richmond, with an average ranking of 8.3 out of 10.0 for all schools in the Greater Vancouver Regional District.

Sports and athletics

Former Canadian International Gary Hirayama is one of the coaches of both the junior and senior rugby teams. The team plays its games on the adjoining South Arm Park Field.

Fall

Winter

Spring 

The senior girls' field hockey ('97, '06) and soccer teams ('07) have both won provincial championships since the school became a Senior High. The senior girls' rugby team has won the school's only provincial championship in 2008.

The Co-Ed Ultimate Frisbee team won back-to-back Tier 2 BCJUC Provincials in 2010 and 2011. In the 2016 spring season, the team was placed in the C Division of Spring Reign Tournament held in Burlington, WA and won. They soon became Richmond School City League Champions for the first time by beating the powerhouse team Richmond High 11-10. This granted them a spot in Tier 1 BCJUC Provincials. McRoberts finished first in their pool. They made it to the finals after defeating Sutherland in the semi-finals on universe point. They won against Stratford Hall in the finals. This was the first time a Richmond High School making it to Tier 1 BCJUC finals and also winning the title.

In the 2019-20 campaign, the Senior Girls Volleyball team won its inaugural South Fraser Championship, replacing the Vancouver and District Championship. The Senior Boys soccer team also won its South Fraser Championship, advancing to provincials.

The school's teams compete in the Richmond League at a district level and either the Vancouver & District or South Fraser league at the regional level. The school competes at a variety of size-levels depending on the sport.

Notable alumni
 Arjan Bhullar, Pro MMA Fighter, Olympic Wrestler (Grad 2004)
 Jonathan Gallivan, musician/producer and guitarist for Moist (band)
 Glenn Gawdin, professional ice hockey player
 Nathan Hirayama, Member, Canadian National Sevens Rugby Team (Grad 2006)
 Carolyn Jarvis, Global News Anchor (Grad 1997)
 Brian Johns, Olympic Swimmer (Grad 2000)
 Darcy Marquardt, Olympic rower (Grad 1997), 2012 Olympic Silver medal
 Coco Rocha, Fashion Model (Grad 2006)
 Vincent Tong, Actor (Grad 1998)
 Cole Walliser, Canadian filmmaker and music video director (Grad 1999)

References

External links

Educational institutions established in 1962
High schools in Richmond, British Columbia
1962 establishments in British Columbia